Edarlyn Reyes Ureña (born 30 September 1997) is a Dominican professional footballer who plays as a left back for Bolivian side Club Always Ready and the Dominican Republic national team.

International career
Reyes made his professional debut for the in a 3–0 win over Cayman Islands on 12 October 2018 for 2019–20 CONCACAF Nations League qualifying.

References

External links
 NFT Profile
 Cibao Profile
 [https://www.playmakerstats.com/player.php?id=671375}
 
 

1997 births
Living people
People from Hermanas Mirabal Province
Dominican Republic footballers
Association football fullbacks
Association football wingers
Dominican Republic international footballers
Dominican Republic expatriate footballers
Dominican Republic expatriate sportspeople in the United States
Dominican Republic expatriate sportspeople in Bolivia
Expatriate soccer players in the United States
Expatriate footballers in Bolivia
Expatriate footballers in the United Arab Emirates
F.A. Euro players
Cibao FC players
Real Santa Cruz players
Emirates Club players
USL League Two players
Liga Dominicana de Fútbol players
Bolivian Primera División players
UAE Pro League players